Patty Acomb (born September 28, 1965) is an American politician serving in the Minnesota House of Representatives since 2019. A member of the Minnesota Democratic–Farmer–Labor Party (DFL), Acomb represents District 44B in the western Twin Cities metropolitan area, which includes the city of Minnetonka and parts of Hennepin County, Minnesota.

Early life, education, and career
Acomb was born in Minnetonka, Minnesota and graduated from Hopkins High School. She attended the University of Minnesota, graduating with a B.S. in natural resources.

Acomb has worked at the Minnesota Department of Natural Resources and the Hennepin County Environmental Services. She also worked on energy policy for the National League of Cities.

Acomb was elected a member of the Minnetonka Park Board in 2009 and then an at-large member of the Minnetonka City Council from 2012 until her election to the state legislature. While a council member, she served on the Bassett Creek Watershed Management Commission, the Metropolitan Council Water Supply Advisory Committee, and the U.S. Environmental Protection Agency's governmental advisory committee. Acomb was appointed by Governor Mark Dayton to serve on the Minnesota Board of Water and Soil Resources from 2015-18.

Minnesota House of Representatives
Acomb was elected to the Minnesota House of Representatives in 2018 and has been reelected every two years since. She first ran after two-term DFL incumbent Jon Applebaum announced he would not seek reelection. 

Acomb is chair of the Climate and Energy Finance and Policy Committee, and sits on the Health Finance and Policy, Sustainable Infrastructure Policy, and Ways and Means Committees. In 2019, she founded and was named chair of the Minnesota House Climate Action Caucus. From 2021-22, Acomb served as vice chair of the Climate and Energy Finance and Policy Committee.

Climate and energy 
Acomb led efforts to move Minnesota to zero greenhouse gas emissions by 2050. She has supported weatherization, and stated she "preferred carrots rather than sticks" to incentivize a transition to a green economy. She authored legislation that would provide schools with grants to install solar energy systems and incorporate teaching about energy into their curricula. She also proposed an amendment that would bar public utilities from giving subsidies to builders to use natural gas. Acomb attended the COP26 climate change conference held in Glasgow in 2021.

Electoral history

Personal life
Acomb and her husband, Craig, have two children. She resides in Minnetonka, Minnesota.

References

External links

 Official House of Representatives website
 Official campaign website

1960s births
Living people
Democratic Party members of the Minnesota House of Representatives
21st-century American politicians
21st-century American women politicians
Women state legislators in Minnesota
Hopkins High School alumni